Bad Boys is a 1995 American buddy cop action film directed by Michael Bay in his feature directorial debut, and produced by Don Simpson and Jerry Bruckheimer. The film stars Martin Lawrence and Will Smith as two Miami narcotics detectives, Marcus Burnett and Mike Lowrey. The film received mixed reviews from critics, was commercially successful and spawned two sequels, Bad Boys II (2003) and Bad Boys for Life (2020).

Plot
Lifelong friends Mike Lowrey and Marcus Burnett are Miami police detectives investigating $100 million of seized Mafia heroin, their biggest career bust which was stolen from a secure police vault. Internal Affairs suspects that it was an inside job and threatens to shut down the entire department unless they recover the drugs within 72 hours.

Mike asks one of his informants and ex-girlfriend Maxine "Max" Logan to look for people who are newly rich and therefore suspects. She gets herself and her best friend Julie Mott hired as escorts by Eddie Dominguez, a crooked former cop. The party is soon interrupted by Dominguez's French drug kingpin boss Fouchet and his henchmen Casper, Ferguson, and Noah. Dominguez and Max are killed, while Julie manages to escape. The madam who hired Julie and Max is disposed of by Noah, who then knocks out Mike as he investigates Max's death.

Frantically calling the police station, Julie insists on talking only to Mike, who is following up on a lead with the Madam. Knowing she never met Mike, captain Conrad Howard forces Marcus to impersonate Mike to talk to her. At her apartment, Marcus and Julie are attacked by some of Fouchet's henchmen, one of whom Marcus kills. When they rendezvous with Mike, Marcus and Mike have to impersonate each other, with Mike living at the Burnett residence while Marcus resides with Julie at Mike's apartment. The two struggle to keep it up in Julie's presence, and she quickly begins to suspect the truth.

Looking through mugshots, Julie identifies Noah as one of the henchmen. The trio go to Club Hell, one of Noah's known hangouts. After being spotted, Marcus knocks Casper unconscious during a bathroom fight. Julie tries to kill Fouchet but Marcus stops her. In the ensuing car chase, Mike kills Noah. The three manage to get away, but are caught on camera by a news helicopter and the report is later seen by Marcus's family, who were told that Marcus was temporarily reassigned to Cleveland.

Mike and Marcus meet their old informant Jojo and learn about the location of the chemist who is cutting the stolen drugs. The three return to Mike's apartment, where Marcus' wife Theresa confronts them and confirms Julie's suspicion they have been impersonating each other. Fouchet and his gang show up and kidnap Julie.

Mike and Marcus' department is shut down by Internal Affairs. Despite being reassigned, Howard delays the order, giving Mike and Marcus more time to solve the case. They access Dominguez's private police database profile and learn that the police secretary Francine is Dominguez's former girlfriend, who was being blackmailed by Fouchet and Dominguez after they took nude photos of her, threatening to post them at her kids' school.

Mike, Marcus, and two other detectives, Sanchez and Ruiz, head to the Miami-Opa Locka Executive Airport. After a fierce shootout, they kill the remainder of Fouchet's henchmen, including Casper and Ferguson, and rescue Julie. They chase a fleeing Fouchet and force his car into a concrete barrier. As Fouchet tries to flee, Mike shoots Fouchet in the leg and arrests him at gunpoint. After a tense conversation with Marcus, Fouchet surreptitiously draws a gun but is shot to death by Mike before he can kill Marcus, avenging Max's death. An exhausted Marcus leaves Julie with Mike and heads home, eager to be reunited with his wife.

Cast

Production
Principal photography began on June 27, 1994, at the Dade Tire company near downtown Miami, the city chosen to replace the original New York locale. Filming continued throughout the area, including South Beach's Tides Hotel, the Mediterranean Biltmore Hotel, the Dade County Courthouse and a multimillion-dollar estate on a private island. The second floor of downtown Miami's Alfred DuPont building was converted into a police station; a freighter on the Miami River into a drug lab. Bad Boys''' climactic scenes were filmed at the Opa-Locka Airport. Filming was quick due to the TV schedules of the stars with production wrapping on August 31. The opening sequence was written and shot during post-production. In the film's early stages of development, Simpson and Bruckheimer initially envisioned Dana Carvey and Jon Lovitz in the roles.  When the film was written for Carvey and Lovitz, the original title for Bad Boys was Bulletproof Hearts. Arsenio Hall turned down the role of Lowrey and cites that choice as the worst mistake he has ever made. The role eventually went to Smith. Both Lawrence and Smith were starring in their own hit TV shows, Martin and The Fresh Prince of Bel-Air, when filming Bad Boys. The Fresh Prince of Bel-Air even references the film in an episode. In the season 6, episode 20, called "I Stank Horse", Nicholas "Nicky" Banks tells Will that his parents will not let him watch Bad Boys, to which Will replies, "Bad Boys, huh? What'cha gonna do?"

Improvisation
Director Bay did not like the script and often engaged Smith and Lawrence in discussions about how the dialogue and scenes could improve. He often allowed them to improvise while the cameras were rolling. He secretly told Smith to call Lawrence a bitch before the car scene. The whole "two bitches in the sea" was improvised, as was Lawrence's comment when Leoni called him gay. The scene in the convenience store, when the clerk puts a gun to Burnett and Lowrey's heads and yells, telling them to "Freeze, mother bitches!", is also improvised. They came up with: "No, you freeze, bitch! Now back up, put the gun down and get me a pack of Tropical Fruit Bubbalicious". "And some Skittles." According to Bay in the DVD commentary, at the end of the film when Mike and Marcus are recuperating, Mike says "I love you, man." Bay claims that Smith refused to say the line, causing the director and actor to argue back and forth over the line. Bay wanted Smith to say the line as he felt it summed up the friendship between the cops. After their argument had lasted for half of the day's shoot and much of the crew was ready to pack up, a fed up Bay told Smith to do whatever he wanted, after which Smith changed his mind and agreed to say the line.

Music

Reception
Box officeBad Boys was commercially successful, grossing $141,407,024 worldwide — $65,807,024 in North America and $75,600,000 internationally.

Critical reception
On Rotten Tomatoes,  Bad Boys has an approval rating of 43% based on reviews from 67 critics, with an average rating of 5.30/10. The site's critical consensus reads: "Bad Boys stars Will Smith and Martin Lawrence have enjoyable chemistry; unfortunately, director Michael Bay too often drowns it out with set pieces and explosions in place of an actual story." On Metacritic, the film has a weighted average score of 41 out of 100, based on 24 critics, indicating "mixed or average reviews". Audiences polled by CinemaScore gave the film an average grade of "A" on an A+ to F scale.

Most of the criticisms focused on the fact that despite the production of the film and the ability of the stars, the script did not diverge from the generic plot of a buddy-cop genre film, instead opting for repeated use of formulaic scenes.Ebert, Roger., Siskel, Gene., 1995 Bad Boys Review [Internet Video] Available at http://bventertainment.go.com/tv/buenavista/atm/reviews.html?sec=1&subsec=1313 Buena-Vista Television

Roger Ebert in his video review of the film on At the Movies noted that despite the highly energetic approach of the two lead actors and the visual style of the film, their acting talents were mostly "new wine in old bottles". He illustrated that many of the elements featured in the film including both the plot and characters had been recycled from other films, particularly those from the Lethal Weapon and Beverly Hills Cop series—recurrent stock-characters, police detective clichés and over-long action scenes. In describing the archetypal cop-buddy genre action scene adhered to by the film, Ebert noted "Whenever a movie like this starts to drag, there's always one infallible solution; have a car-chase and then blow something up real good." Ebert gave the film 2 out of 4 stars.

Gene Siskel in his appraisal of the film said that he had lost interest in the film after its introduction due to the very formulaic approach, and repeated Roger Ebert's criticism that the talents of the lead actors were wasted; suggesting that the production company did not spend significant time producing a script which would be suitable for their talents. Siskel gave the film 2 out of 4.

 Home media Bad Boys was released on DVD on June 27, 2000.A UMD release on December 20 2005 .A Blu-ray release followed on June 1, 2010. Bad Boys was released in a two movie pack that includes Bad Boys II'' on Ultra HD Blu-ray on September 4, 2018.

See also
 Bad Boys (franchise) 
 Bade Miyan Chote Miyan (1998), an Indian film inspired inspired from Bad boys.

References

External links

 
 
 
 

1995 films
1995 action comedy films
1995 directorial debut films
1990s chase films
1990s buddy comedy films
1990s buddy cop films
1990s heist films
1990s police comedy films
1990s police procedural films
1990s English-language films
African-American films
American films about revenge
American action comedy films
American buddy comedy films
American buddy cop films
American chase films
American heist films
American police detective films
Bad Boys (franchise)
Columbia Pictures films
Fictional portrayals of the Miami-Dade Police Department
Films about drugs
Films about friendship
Films directed by Michael Bay
Films produced by Don Simpson
Films produced by Jerry Bruckheimer
Films scored by Mark Mancina
Films set in 1995
Films set in Coral Gables, Florida
Films set in Miami
Films shot in Miami
Hood films
Mafia comedy films
1990s American films